Capo Peloro Lighthouse is an active lighthouse located in Punta del Faro on the Strait of Messina, the most north-eastern promontory of Sicily, settled in the Province of Messina, the place closest to Calabria.

Description
The first lighthouse was built in 1853, then rebuilt in 1884 and heavily damaged by the 1908 Messina earthquake. The lighthouse was inactive for a long time, then it was restored but the height was 
shortened to the current. Another light positioned at   emits a red flash on and off in a 5 seconds period. The lighthouse is completely automated, powered by the mains power and is operated by the Marina Militare with the identification code number 2736 E.F.

See also
 List of lighthouses in Italy
 Punta del Faro

References

External links

 Servizio Fari Marina Militare

Lighthouses in Italy